Hullbridge is a village, civil parish and electoral ward  in the Rochford district of Essex in east England.  Bordered to the north by the River Crouch, and semi-isolated from the nearby village of Hockley and town of Rayleigh, Hullbridge has a population of around 7,300 (2009), measured at 6,527 at the Census 2011.

Prehistoric relics, such as Mesolithic flint axes, have been found in the parish. In the History of Rochford Hundred by Phillip Benton 1857 page 287 Hullbridge is listed as being Whoulnebregg 1375 Ct, Wolvebrigg 1377 Cl, Whulbridge 1492, t Eliza EAS (NS) iii, (OS)i, -bredg 1559 Ct, Hul(l)brigge 1480 Will, -bridge 1540 Ct, 1545 LP, Hulbredge 1544 FF, Hollbridge 1492 EAS (NS) iii, -brigge 1494 ib. "The bridge over the Huolne or Wholve, an old name of the Crouch supra 6. Folklore has it that a Roman Bridge existed here but there is no documented evidence to support a Roman bridge. Essex Record Office however has records relating to a bridge, and to its upkeep and indeed an accident on or from the bridge. Maps of Essex from 16th Century onwards until the mid 18th Century do show the bridge. Benton's book discusses a document that discloses the existence in the reign of Elizabeth I  of a bridge here.

The OED defines "wholve" as a "short
arched or covered drain under a path." The word appears to be local to this part of Essex. This definition may cast doubt on it being the old name for the Crouch but may suggest this is the form of the bridge

Along the river bank there are remains of evaporation pans where salt was made in Bronze Age times.
As captured by well renowned Countryside historian Oliver Rackham in his publication "History of Countryside" The field structures in and around Hullbridge and South Woodham Ferrers were formed during the Iron Age so an ancient settlement in or around Hullbridge is highly likely especially given the Saxon Burial ground finds in Rawreth when the Park school was being built.

Before the coming of the railways to Rayleigh, Hullbridge's wharf's were important for the distribution of various commodities especially, coal and shale. It was from here that Rayleigh received such goods. One of the wharfs was later to be used for a Brickworks.

The current village of Hullbridge was around until 1929 two communities in the parish of Hockley. One named Hullbridge, the other High Elms. In 1929 the owners of High Elms farm sold most of the land for development, so like its neighbour across the river South Woodham Ferrers it became a "Plotland" ripe for holiday homes. So began the growth of the village

The village includes Riverside Primary School (opened September 2010, following the amalgamation of the infant and junior schools), a post office, a library and two pubs, The Anchor  and The Smugglers Den (members only). Both overlook the river and have external drinking facilities. It also has three shopping facilities, One Stop, and two iterations of The Co-operative Food (one being operated by Chelmsford Star Co-operative Society), a Chinese and fish and chip takeaway service and an Indian restaurant.

A frequent bus service to Southend via Rayleigh, gives a rail link with London and Southend.

Sport and leisure
Hullbridge has a Non-League football club Hullbridge Sports F.C. who play at Lower Road.

Leisure facilities include yacht clubs, a sports and social club, and the Hullbridge Community Centre. Lords Golf and Country Club  is situated on the main road out of Hullbridge towards Rayleigh. In addition, there are a number of riverside and country walks that start, finish or pass through Hullbridge.

References

External links

Photosphere of River Crouch, Hullbridge by John Goulding, Visual360Media.com
Hullbridge Memories and History
Hullbridge Memories and History Forum
Hullbridge Parish Council
Hullbridge Sports FC

Villages in Essex
Rochford District